This is a list of all managers of Fenerbahçe, including honours.

Managers

Statistics

Records

Nationalities
As of June 2022.

Most games managed
As of June 2018.

References

Notes

Main

 
Fenerbahce
Managers